Gawrychy  is a village in the administrative district of Gmina Zbójna, within Łomża County, Podlaskie Voivodeship, in north-eastern Poland.

References

Gawrychy
Łomża Governorate
Warsaw Voivodeship (1919–1939)